George William Patchett (23 December 1901 - before 31 December 1974) was a British motorcycle racer and engineer.

Career
In his early career he was a motor cycle racer for motorcycle manufacturers such as Brough Superior, McEvoy and the Belgian arms company FN. At Pendine, Wales he won the Welsh TT in 1925 and the Welsh TT sidecar in 1927 on Brough machines.

In 1930 he was recruited by the Czech arms manufacturer František Janeček, founder of the JAWA motorcycle company. Janeček wanted to build a cheaper motor cycle than their current model. Patchett's contacts with the Villiers company enabled a new JAWA model to be designed around the Villiers 175cc two-stroke engine which proved very popular.

On the outbreak of World War II in 1939, Patchett returned to England and started work under the auto-engineer George Lanchester at the Sterling Armaments Company in Dagenham, Essex, helping to gear up manufacture of the Lanchester sub-machine gun. On his way out of Prague he managed to throw prototype samples of Janeček's new anti-tank device over the wall of the British Embassy.

By 1942, he was leading a design team to design a new sub-machine gun to the army's specification which was referred to as the "Patchett Machine Carbine". After successfully taking part in extensive army trials in the mid to late 1940s it was adopted by the British Army to replace the Sten gun and known by them as the 9mm Sterling sub-machine gun L2A1. A modified version, the L2A3, was the very popular Sterling Mk IV which saw service until the 1990s.

In 1966, the British High Court awarded Patchett £116,975 (£ as of ) for the British government's use of the machine gun he patented. The same amount was awarded to Sterling, which had sued for half a million pounds. Mr. Justice Lloyd-Jacob referred to Patchett as "a distinguished inventor and valued designer" in making the award.

References

English engineers
Firearm designers
British motorcycle racers
1901 births
1974 deaths